William Frederic Powell Moore (23 March 1846 – 23 February 1919) was an English first-class cricketer.

Moore made his debut in first-class cricket for the Marylebone Cricket Club against Gloucestershire at Lord's in 1870. Nine years later he made a second appearance in first-class cricket for the Gentlemen of England against the Gentlemen of Kent at Canterbury. He scored 21 runs across these two matches, with a high score of 19 not out. He died at Holborn in February 1919.

References

External links

1846 births
1919 deaths
People from Westminster
English cricketers
Marylebone Cricket Club cricketers
Gentlemen of England cricketers